Atthasit Mahitthi (born 13 September 1978) is a former professional Thai snooker player.

Mahitthi reached the semi-final at the 2006 IBSF World Amateur Championship in Amman, Jordan, where he was eliminated by Kurt Maflin 8–4.
He has earned a place on the Main Tour for the 2008–09 season by winning the 2007 IBSF World Amateur Championship, but dropped off at the end of the 2009–10 season. He had a good run in the 2008 Bahrain Championship, winning 3 qualifying matches before being paired with veteran Steve Davis. He narrowly lost 5–4 to Davis in the final qualifying round – which was perhaps unfortunate considering Davis was unlikely to play in the event due to a fixture clash, and he did withdraw a short time after.

In 2002 he qualified for the first round of the ranking LG Cup, but lost 1–5 in the first round proper to David Gray, in one of the first televised matches to be refereed by Michaela Tabb.

Career finals

Amateur finals: 2 (1 title)

References

Living people
1978 births
Atthasit Mahitthi
Asian Games medalists in cue sports
Cue sports players at the 2006 Asian Games
Atthasit Mahitthi
Medalists at the 2006 Asian Games
Atthasit Mahitthi
Atthasit Mahitthi
Atthasit Mahitthi
Southeast Asian Games medalists in cue sports
Competitors at the 2005 Southeast Asian Games
Competitors at the 2007 Southeast Asian Games
Competitors at the 2009 World Games